Annaclara Cataldi Palau is an Italian palaeographer specialising in Greek mediaeval and renaissance palaeography and history of the book.

Life 
Annaclara Cataldi was born in Genoa and studied Classics in the University of Genoa, then she lived several years in Paris and studied Greek palaeography at the Sorbonne. Her studies there culminated in a ‘Doctorat’ in Greek Palaeography. In 1994 she was commissioned to catalogue the Greek manuscripts in the Bodleian Library, Oxford, published 2011. She was Visiting Professor in the Department of Classics at King's College London 2000-2005 and Visiting Professor in Greek Palaeography at Royal Holloway, University of London, The Hellenic Institute, from 2011-2016; she is currently Cultore della materia at Università Cattolica del Sacro Cuore, Milano, 2015-2018.

In palaeography she proposed new criteria to distinguish 8th-century manuscripts from those of the 9th century: the development of accentuation and the regularity of the accentuation suggest a date in the 9th century; while abundant colourful decoration is uncharacteristic of the eighth century. Rich ornamentation is infrequent in 8th-century manuscripts, which mostly have uncomplicated initials.

Works 
 Catalogo dei manoscritti greci della Biblioteca Franzoniana (Genova) : (Urbani 2-20) (Accademia nazionale dei Lincei, Bollettino dei Classici, Suppl. n. 8), Roma, 1990; Urbani 21-40, Roma 1996.
 "La biblioteca del Cardinale Giovanni Salviati: Alcuni nuovi manoscritti greci in biblioteche diverse della Vaticana", in: Scriptorium: Revue internationale des études relative aux manuscrits; 49 (1995)
 Gian Francesco d'Asola e la tipografia aldina: La vita, le edizioni, la biblioteca dell'Asolano, Genoa: Sagep Libri & Communicazione, 1998
 "A Little Known Manuscript of the Gospels in ‘Maiuscola biblica’: Basil. Gr A. N. III. 12", in: Byzantion; 74 (2004): 463-516
 "The Burdett-Coutts collection of Greek manuscripts: manuscripts from Epirus" in: Codices Manuscripti (2006), 31-64
 Studies in Greek Manuscripts, Testi, Studi, Strumenti, 24, II volumes, Centro Italiano di Studi sull'Alto Mediovo, Spoleto 2008
 'A Catalogue of Greek Manuscripts from the Meerman Collection in the Bodleian Library', Bodleian Library,University of Oxford,   2011

External links 
 Fondazione Centro Italiano Distributi

Italian palaeographers
Living people
Year of birth missing (living people)
Academics of King's College London